Amphidasya is a genus of flowering plants in the family Rubiaceae. It was described by Paul Carpenter Standley in 1936. The genus is found in Central America and northern South America.

Species
 Amphidasya ambigua (Standl.) Standl. - Panama, Colombia, Ecuador
 Amphidasya amethystina J.L.Clark & C.M.Taylor - Ecuador
 Amphidasya brevidentata C.M.Taylor - Colombia
 Amphidasya bullata Standl. - Colombia
 Amphidasya colombiana (Standl.) Steyerm. - Colombia, Ecuador, Peru
 Amphidasya elegans C.M.Taylor - Colombia, Ecuador
 Amphidasya intermedia Steyerm. - Colombia
 Amphidasya longicalycina (Dwyer) C.M.Taylor - Costa Rica, Nicaragua, Panamá, Colombia
 Amphidasya neblinae Steyerm. - Venezuela, Brazil 
 Amphidasya panamensis C.M.Taylor - Panamá
 Amphidasya spathulata Dwyer - Panamá, Colombia
 Amphidasya umbrosa (Wernham) Standl. - Colombia
 Amphidasya venezuelensis (Standl.) Steyerm. - Venezuela

References

External links 
 Amphidasya in the World Checklist of Rubiaceae

Rubiaceae genera
Urophylleae
Flora of Central America
Flora of South America